Liudys Masso is a paralympic athlete from Cuba competing mainly in category F13 discus throw events.

Liudys competed at the 2000 Summer Paralympics winning the gold medal in the F13 discus with a new world record.  She then attempted to defend her title in the 2004 Summer Paralympics bit was unable to get a legal performance.

References

Paralympic athletes of Cuba
Athletes (track and field) at the 2000 Summer Paralympics
Athletes (track and field) at the 2004 Summer Paralympics
Paralympic gold medalists for Cuba
Living people
Medalists at the 2000 Summer Paralympics
Year of birth missing (living people)
Paralympic medalists in athletics (track and field)
Cuban female discus throwers
Visually impaired discus throwers
Paralympic discus throwers
21st-century Cuban women